The Algerine-class minesweeper was a large group of minesweepers built for the Royal Navy (RN) and the Royal Canadian Navy (RCN) during the Second World War. 110 ships of the class were launched between 1942 and 1944.

Design and description
By 1940 the Royal Navy had realized that the s were too small to carry the equipment needed to handle magnetic mines. A bigger ship was designed, ironically about the same size as the older  that the Royal Navy had rejected earlier as too large and expensive for mass production. The size of the new ship made them suitable for use as ocean-going escort ships and many were used in that role to fill a critical shortage of escorts. In fact most of the ships built for the RCN were solely employed as such and were fitted with more dedicated anti-submarine weapons than the RN ships. To maximise production, alternate designs were made to use either steam turbines or reciprocating steam engines. This enabled ships to be built at yards more used to merchant ship design, and as with other mass-produced escort vessels (such as the s, or the s, could use merchant-style reciprocating vertical triple expansion (VTE) engines.

Both groups of ships had the same dimensions, although the VTE powered ships had a greater displacement and a deeper draught.
The turbine group had a draught of  while the reciprocating ships sat  deeper in the water.
The ships' complement consisted of 85 officers and ratings.

The turbine-powered ships had two Parsons geared steam turbines, each driving one shaft, using steam provided by two Admiralty three-drum boilers.
The reciprocating ships had two vertical triple-expansion steam engines totalling  and reached the same speed.

The Algerine class was armed with a QF  Mk V anti-aircraft gun and four twin-gun mounts for Oerlikon 20 mm cannon. The latter guns were in short supply when the first ships were being completed and they often got a proportion of single mounts. By 1944, single-barrel Bofors 40 mm mounts began replacing the twin 20 mm mounts on a one for one basis. All of the ships were fitted for four throwers and two rails for depth charges. Many Canadian ships omitted their sweeping gear in exchange for a 24-barrel Hedgehog spigot mortar and a stowage capacity for 90+ depth charges.

The construction contracts were awarded to shipbuilders in both the United Kingdom and Canada.

United Kingdom
Blyth Dry Docks & Shipbuilding Co., Blyth
 Fleming & Ferguson, Port Glasgow
 Harland & Wolff, Belfast
 Lobnitz & Co., Paisley
 William Simons & Co., Paisley

Canada
Collingwood Shipbuilding Co., Collingwood
Port Arthur Shipbuilding Co., Thunder Bay
Toronto Shipbuilding Co., Toronto
Redfern Construction Co., Toronto

Construction
A total of 94 Algerine class vessels served with the Royal Navy; of these 45 were built in the UK and another 49 in Canada. A further 12 vessels served with the Royal Canadian Navy; all these were built in Canada.

The ships were built in the UK were ordered under the 1940 to 1943 war emergency building programmes.
The companies involved were Harland & Wolff (22), Lobnitz (18), Blyth (2), Fleming & Ferguson (1) and William Simons (2). Another 15 were ordered in 1943 but cancelled, to free yard space for building Loch class frigates.
The ships were built in two types; 26 powered by steam turbine and 22 by reciprocating or vertical triple expansion (VTE) steam engines. The turbine powered ships were all built by Harland & Wolff, save two, built at Blyth; the VTE powered ships were built at Lobnitz, Simons and Fleming & Ferguson.

Of the ships built in Canada, the companies involved were Toronto Shipbuilding (later Redfern), Port Arthur and Collingwood. All the Canadian-built ships were VTE powered. Only 12 of these ships served with the RCN; a further 17 were built for the RCN but transferred to the Royal Navy in exchange for an equal number of s, as the RCN was in need of escort vessels. Fourteen ships were built for the United States Navy, but again were transferred to the RN on completion under Lend-Lease. Nineteen ships were ordered directly by the RN under the 1943 programme; a further six ships were ordered, but cancelled.

Service history
The Algerine class vessels in service with the Royal Navy were employed mainly as minesweepers, though they were equipped as anti-submarine warfare vessels also, and could serve as escort ships as needed. Their ASDIC and depth-charge equipment was equal to that of the s, or even s, though they were not equipped with forward-firing weapons like Hedgehog. Five Algerines were sunk in action, and four others were declared constructive total losses after sustaining damage.

The Algerines of the Royal Canadian Navy by contrast were employed as escorts. They were not fitted with mine-sweeping gear, though they were optimized for service in the Arctic. The Algerines served principally as senior ships in Canadian escort groups of the Western Local Escort Force and the Halifax Force. No RCN vessels of the class were lost.

Post-war service
After the war, a number of Algerines continued in service as patrol boats, survey ships, and training ships. On 11 March 1959, HMS Acute and HMS Jewel, training ships at Dartmouth, rescued the burning German coaster Vorman Rass, off Start Point, Devon.
At least one, HMS Pickle,  was still engaged in minesweeping duties in British waters as late as 1955.
All Algerines in RN and RCN service were disposed of by the late 1950s or early 1960s.

Some were sold to other navies or into merchant service. The fourteen ships under Lend-Lease were returned to the USN in 1946; five of these later transferred to the Greek Navy. Of the RN ships, five were transferred to the Belgian Navy, two to South Africa and two to Ceylon; another five, one apiece, were acquired by Burma, Nigeria, Italy, Iran, and Thailand. Two RCN ships were transferred to Belgium in 1959 as replacements for two ex-RN ships that were due for disposal.  One, HTMS Phosampton (ex-), was in service until 2012 with the Royal Thai Navy.

Ships

Post-war operators

Algerines sunk in action
Five Algerines were sunk in action, and four others were declared constructive total losses after sustaining damage.
  was damaged beyond repair by air attack off Bône, Algeria on 2 January 1943.
  was mined, and damaged beyond repair, in the Mediterranean on 20 May 1943
  was mined, and damaged beyond repair, off Ostend on 10 November 1944
  was sunk by a mine off Corfu on 12 January 1945.
  was mined, and damaged beyond repair, off Ostend on 9 May 1945
  was sunk by a mine off Phuket, Thailand on 24 July 1945.
  was sunk by a Japanese kamikaze plane off Phuket, Thailand on 26 July 1945.

References

Bibliography
 

 Peter Elliott (1977) Allied Escort Ships of World War II. MacDonald & Janes,

External links

 Algerine-class from uboat.net
 The Algerine Association
 Algerine-class minesweepers - Radio Fit

 
Mine warfare vessel classes
Ship classes of the Royal Navy